Ukrainian driving licences ( or officially ) are the official documents which authorize their respective holders to operate various types of motor vehicle on public roads.

In 2016, a new design was introduced featuring a blue background color.

In February 2020, following the launch of Diia, the Ukrainian government launched in-app digital driving licenses. Since then, Ukraine has become the fourth country in Europe to have digital driver’s licenses. In February 2021, Verkhovna Rada equated digital driver's licenses in Diia with paper analogs. 

In 2022, a Regulation is adopted by the European Parliament and the council. It established the recognition of Ukrainian driving licences in the European Union when the holder enjoys temporary protection.

References 

Ukraine
Transport in Ukraine